Rupert Bailey (born 20 February 1980) is a South African cricketer. He played in seventeen first-class and fourteen List A matches from 1998 to 2005.

See also
 List of Boland representative cricketers

References

External links
 

1980 births
Living people
South African cricketers
Boland cricketers
Easterns cricketers
Northerns cricketers
Cricketers from Paarl